Krishna Bahadur Mahara is a Nepalese politician, belonging to the Nepal Communist Party (NCP). He was a prominent Maoist leader during the civil war. After the maoists entered the peace process, he was elected to parliament/constituent-assembly multiple times, and also became cabinet minister. Following his election to the house of representatives in the 2017 legislative election, he was elected House Speaker but resigned in October 2019 after allegations of attempted rape were made by a parliamentary staffer. He was acquitted in February 2020.

Career
In the April 2008 Constituent Assembly election he was elected from the Dang-3 constituency, winning 20784 votes. He was subsequently appointed as Minister of Information and Communication in the Cabinet headed by CPN (M) Chairman Prachanda and sworn in on 22 August 2008.

Controversies
In September 2019, an employee of the parliament secretariat came forward alleging attempted rape by a drunk Mahara at her apartment on the night of 29 September. Mahara resigned as Speaker on 1 October at the behest of his party, and was subsequently arrested.

References

See also
Shakti Bahadur Basnet
Top Bahadur Rayamajhi

1958 births
Living people
People from Rolpa District
Communist Party of Nepal (Maoist Centre) politicians
Government ministers of Nepal
Nepalese atheists
Information and Communications ministers of Nepal
Speakers of the House of Representatives (Nepal)
Finance ministers of Nepal
Nepal MPs 2017–2022
Nepal Communist Party (NCP) politicians
Nepal MPs 1991–1994
People of the Nepalese Civil War

Members of the 1st Nepalese Constituent Assembly
Members of the 2nd Nepalese Constituent Assembly